Barry George Frost (born 6 February 1958) is a former New Zealand cricket umpire.

Life and career
Frost grew up on a dairy farm near Leigh, north of Auckland. He attended Mahurangi College in Warkworth before going to Auckland to work. He played club cricket in Auckland, and after retiring from senior ranks he took up umpiring in 1995–96.

Frost made his List A cricket umpiring debut in 1998 and first-class cricket debut in the following year. He umpired three Twenty20 Internationals between 2010 and 2012, and 10 women's One-day internationals between 1997 and 2015. He was the founding President of the New Zealand Professional Cricket Umpires' Association in 2011. 

In 2015–16 Frost became the eighth New Zealand umpire to officiate in 100 first-class matches. He retired after the 2015–16 season.

See also
 List of Twenty20 International cricket umpires

External links

References

1958 births
Living people
Sportspeople from Auckland
New Zealand cricket umpires
New Zealand Twenty20 International cricket umpires
People educated at Mahurangi College